Luke Alexander Sears (born 3 April 1980 in  Portsmouth, Hampshire) is a former English cricketer. Sears is a right-handed batsman who bowled right-arm medium pace.

Sears represented [Hampshire County Cricket Club] through the ages 11 to 19. Of which the final [under 17 - 19 year] he captained the county to national successes.

Sears made his List-A debut for the Hampshire Cricket Board in the 1999 NatWest Trophy against Suffolk. During the tournament he played a further two matches against Shropshire and Glamorgan.

Sears also represented the Hampshire Second XI in six matches between 1998 and 1999.

Since 2001 Luke Sears has been competing at a national level in angling. Sears is currently sponsored by Daiwa Sports along with the commercial fishery he co-owns [Hallcroft Coarse Fishery]. His accolades in angling to date include:

 Pontins Festival Winner 2003
 Maver Pairs Runner-up 2005
 British Pole Pairs Champion 2009
 3rd in Uk Championship 2008 + 2009
 Over 100 open circuit match wins
 Highest Match weight - 224 lb [Fishomania qualifier - Decoy Lakes]
 Heaviest Fish - 21 lb 2oz Mirror Carp

External links
Luke Sears at Cricinfo
Luke Sears at CricketArchive

1980 births
Living people
Cricketers from Portsmouth
English cricketers
Hampshire Cricket Board cricketers